Ataptatanū refers to someone who has not subjected himself to the heat of tapas.

Etymology 
Ataptatanū derives from atapta which means - 'not heated, cool' (from tapa meaning 'to burn, heat up') and tanū – means - 'body, the physical self'; therefore, ataptatanū literally means – 'he whose body or mass is not prepared in fire', 'raw'.

History and meaning 
The compound word ataptatanū appears in the mantras of the Mandala 9 of the Rigveda. In a sukta addressed to Pavmāna Somo Devatā, Rishi Pavitra prays:

In this mantra, ataptatanūh, refers to the one who has not subjected himself to the heat of tapas, tadāmah refers to one who is raw and who therefore, aśnute - cannot experience the highest bliss because his body is not yet properly prepared to receive the knowledge he seeks.

In his Satyarth Prakash (Light of Truth), Swami Dayananda Saraswati explains that tapas does not refer to branding one's body with literal fire, and this is also clarified by Rishi Pavitra in the subsequent mantra which reads:

Tapas (or tapasya) is practical discipline; according to the Bhagavada Gita (17.14).

"Worship of gods, the twice-born, one's elders, the teachers, and the wise men, purity, straightness of conduct, chastity, and non-violence: these are the tapasya of the body. 

The finishing phase of a scholar's higher education was called tapasya in the time of Krishna. Gandhi considered tapasya to be the test of love, ahimsa, self-suffering, and self-sacrifice, which are essential in the quest for truth.

Accordingly, ataptatanū refers to someone who has not yet experienced such practical discipline.

References

Bibliography 

 

Vedanta
Sanskrit words and phrases
Hindu philosophical concepts
Buddhist philosophical concepts
Jain philosophical concepts
Yoga concepts